Jack Nielsen may refer to:

 Jack Nielsen (tennis) (1896–1981), Norwegian tennis player
 Jack Nielsen (skier) (born 1923), his son, Norwegian alpine skier